This is a list of the top-level leaders for religious groups with at least 50,000 adherents, and that led anytime from January 1, 301, to December 31, 400. It should likewise only name leaders listed on other articles and lists.

Christianity

Chalcedonian Christianity
Church of Rome (complete list) –
Marcellinus, Pope (296–304)
Marcellus I, Pope (308–309)
Eusebius, Pope (309–310)
Miltiades, Pope (311–314)
Sylvester I, Pope (314–335)
Mark, Pope (336)
Julius I, Pope (337–352)
Liberius, Pope (352–366)
Felix II, Antipope (355–365)
Damasus, Pope (366–384)
Ursinus, Antipope (366–367)
Liberius, Pope (352–366)
Anastasius I, Pope (399–401)

Church of Constantinople (complete list) –
Probus, Bishop of Byzantium (293–306)
 Metrophanes, Bishop of Byzantium (306–314)
Alexander, Bishop of Byzantium (314–337)
Paul I ("the Confessor"), Archbishop of Constantinople (337–339, 341–342, 346–350)
Eusebius of Nicomedia, Archbishop of Constantinople (339–341)
Macedonius I, Archbishop of Constantinople (342–346, 351–360)
Eudoxius of Antioch, Archbishop of Constantinople (360–370)
Florentius, Archbishop of Constantinople (c. 363) (Anomoean rival to Eudoxius)
Demophilus, Archbishop of Constantinople (370–380)
Evagrius, Archbishop of Constantinople (370 or 379)
Maximus I, Archbishop of Constantinople (380)
Gregory of Nazianzus, Archbishop of Constantinople (380–381)
Nectarius, Archbishop of Constantinople (381–397)
John Chrysostom, Archbishop of Constantinople (398–404)

Church of Alexandria (complete list) –
Peter I, Hierarch of Alexandria (300–311)
Achillas, Hierarch of Alexandria (312–313)
Athanasius I, Patriarch of Alexandria (328–339, 346–373) 
Gregory of Cappadocia (339–346), Arian Patriarch; not accepted by the adherents of the Nicene creed (and thus not counted by Coptic Orthodox, Byzantine Orthodox or Catholic lineages) 
Peter II (373–380)
Lucius of Alexandria (373–377), an Arian installed by Emperor Valentinian I and not recognized by the adherents of the Nicene Creed
Timothy I, Patriarch of Alexandria (380–385) 
Theophilus I, Patriarch of Alexandria (385–412)

Church of Antioch (complete list) –
Cyril, Bishop (279/280–303)
Tyrannion, Bishop (304–314)
Vitalis, Bishop (314–320)
Philogonius, Bishop (320–324)
Eustathius, Patriarch (324–330)
Paulinus, Patriarch (331–332)
Eulalius, Patriarch (330)
Euphronius, Patriarch (332–333)
Flacillus, Patriarch (333/4–342)
Stephen I, Patriarch (342–344)
Leontius, Patriarch (344–357/8)
Eudoxius, Patriarch (358–359)
Annanius, Patriarch (359)
Meletius (360–381)
Euzoius, Patriarch (360/1–376) 
Vitalis, Patriarch (375) 
Dorotheus, Patriarch (376–381) 
Paulinus II, Patriarch (362–388) 
Flavian I, Patriarch (381–404)
Evagrius, Patriarch (388–392/393) 

Church of Jerusalem (complete list) –
Ermon, Bishop of Jerusalem (Aelia Capitolina) (283–314)
Macarius I, Bishop of Jerusalem (Aelia Capitolina) (314–333) 
Maximus III, Bishop of Jerusalem (333–348)
Cyril I, Bishop of Jerusalem (350–386)
John II, Bishop of Jerusalem (386–417)

Judaism

Rabbinic Judaism

Nasi of the Sanhedrin
Judah III, Nasi (c.290–320)
Hillel II, Nasi (320–365)
Gamaliel V, Nasi (365–385)
Judah IV, Nasi (385–400)

Exilarch
Nehemiah, Exilarch (in 313)
Ukban ben Nehmiah, Exilarch (c. 400?)
Nathan Ukban II, Exilarch (370 to about 400?)
Huna bar Nathan

See also

Religious leaders by year

References

External links
 http://www.rulers.org/relig.html

04th century
Religious leaders
 
Religious Leaders